INDC may refer to:

 Indian National Democratic Congress, an Indian political party
 Iraqi National Dialogue Council, a Sunni Arab political party
 International Nutrition and Diagnostics Conference, an International conference on nutrition
 Intended Nationally Determined Contributions